The Clark Royster House is a historic home located at Clarksville, Mecklenburg County, Virginia. It was built about 1840, and is a two-story, single-pile Federal style brick dwelling.  Also on the property are the contributing site of a combined kitchen and slave quarters and an original 65-foot-deep rock well.  It was the former home of Clark Royster, founder of the town of Clarksville.

It was listed on the National Register of Historic Places in 1996.

References

Houses on the National Register of Historic Places in Virginia
Federal architecture in Virginia
Houses completed in 1840
Houses in Mecklenburg County, Virginia
National Register of Historic Places in Mecklenburg County, Virginia
Slave cabins and quarters in the United States